Shajiabang is a town in Changshu, Suzhou, China; a tourist village located adjacent to Yangcheng Lake in Jiangsu Province, China. There is a scenic area in the town named Shajiabang Resort.

Tourism attractions
It comprises various tourist attractions such as the Revolutionary Traditional Education Area, the Redstone folk culture village, the National Defense Education Park, and a reed maze.

Cultural reference
Shajiabang has found fame as the subject of the Chinese opera Shajiabang which was nationally popular in 1960s to 1970s (previously written Shachiapang).
There is a TV series named "Sha Jia Bang" which is acted by Chen daoming and Xuqing. It tells the story of Aqing, a woman who helps the Chinese army to fight against the Japanese army with the aid of some local residents.

Local products
Yangcheng Lake hairy crab, the best known.
Duck blood-black glutinous rice sushi
Green dumplings
Pictures made from reeds

References

Changshu